Peter Boehringer (born 6 April 1969) is a German politician for the populist Alternative for Germany (AfD) and since 2017 member of the Bundestag, the federal legislative body. Since 2018 he is Chairman of the Budgetary Committee of the German Bundestag.

Life and achievements
Boehringer was born 1969 in the West German town of Schwäbisch Gmünd and studied at the EBS University of Business and Law. He has a Master of Business Administration.

Boehringer is member of the German libertarian Friedrich August von Hayek society.

In 2015, Boehringer entered the populist AfD and became member of the Bundestag in 2017.

He gained some media attention after the leak of private e-mails, in which he called the German chancellor Angela Merkel 'Merkelnutte' (Merkelbitch).

Boehringer denies the scientific consensus on climate change.

References

Living people
1969 births
People from Schwäbisch Gmünd
Members of the Bundestag 2021–2025
Members of the Bundestag 2017–2021
Members of the Bundestag for the Alternative for Germany